Akij Group is one of the largest Bangladeshi industrial conglomerates. The industries under this conglomerate include textiles, tobacco, food and beverage, cement, ceramics, printing and packaging, pharmaceuticals, consumer products etc. In 2009, Akij Group paid 390 million euros in tax, making it the biggest local tax-payer, contributing two per cent to the nation's entire budget. Akij also provides services in healthcare, information and communication technology. Its turnover in 2009 was 89 billion taka. In 2018, Akij sold their tobacco division to JTI for $1.47 billion. It was the biggest ever single foreign direct investment in Bangladesh.

History 
Akij Group was established in the 1940s by industrialist Sheikh Akijuddin as a jute trading business, before moving into cigarettes and other areas of business.

Sister projects 
In August 2018, Japan Tobacco acquires Akij's tobacco business for US$1.5 billion.

 Akij Bakers Limited.
 Akij Plastics Limited.
 Akij Cables limited.
 Abrar Tours and Travels
 Ad-din Foundation
 Akij Automotive Industry
 Akij Biri Factory Ltd.
 Akij Cement Company Ltd.
 Akij Ceramics Company Ltd.
 Akij Computer Ltd.
 Akij Corporation Limited
 Akij Food & Beverage Ltd.
 Akij Foundation School & College
 Akij Gas Company Ltd.
 Akij Gas Station Ltd.
 Akij Hotel and Resorts 
 Akij Institute of Technology
 Akij Jute Mills Ltd. 
 Akij Match Factory Ltd.
 Akij Motors 
 Akij Particle Board Mills Ltd.
 Akij Pharmaceuticals Ltd.
 Akij Printing & Packaging Ltd
 Akij Real Estate Ltd.
 Akij Securities Ltd. 
 Akij Textile Mills Ltd.
 Akij Wildlife Farm Limited
 Akij Zarda Factory Ltd.
 Dhaka Tobacco Industries
 S.A.F Industries Ltd.
 Akij Foundation School and College (Uttara, Manikganj, and Mohammadpur)
Akij Rice Mill Industry
Akij Flour Mill Industry
Akij Ceramics Ltd.
Akij BIAX Films Limited.
Blue Pill Limited
iBOS Limited
Akij Assets Ltd

References

External links

Job Links

Manufacturing companies based in Dhaka
Pharmaceutical companies of Bangladesh
Conglomerate companies of Bangladesh
Manufacturing companies established in 1940